At least two ships of the Royal Navy have been named HMS Whippingham :

 HMS Whippingham, an auxiliary paddle minesweeper serving in World War II
 , a  completed in 1955 and immediately transferred to France as Dahlia

Royal Navy ship names